As of September 2006, the size of the banking industry is 88.2% of total financial sector in Turkey. There are 51 banks as of April 2022: 3 public deposit, 8 private deposit, 21 foreign deposit, 3 public investment, 9 private investment, 4 foreign investment, 4 participation banks and 3 banks under the supervision of the TMSF. Notice also that total bank assets, as of September 2006, are 473.7 billion Turkish lira. This makes up 86.3% of the gross national product.

Below is a list of banking institutions operating in Turkey, provided by the Turkish Banking Regulation and Supervision Agency and the Banks Association of Turkey

List of banks in Turkey by total assets

Deposit banks

State-owned deposit banks
 Türkiye Cumhuriyeti Ziraat Bankası A.Ş. 
 Türkiye Halk Bankası A.Ş. 
 Türkiye Vakıflar Bankası T.A.O. (not actually owned by the state; see the article for further information)

Privately owned deposit banks
 Adabank A.Ş. 
 Akbank T.A.Ş. 
 Anadolubank A.Ş. 
 Fibabanka A.Ş. 
 Şekerbank T.A.Ş. 
 Türk Ekonomi Bankası A.Ş. 
 Turkish Bank A.Ş. 
 Türkiye İş Bankası A.Ş. 
 Yapı ve Kredi Bankası A.Ş.

Banks under TMSF
 Birleşik Fon Bankası A.Ş. (formerly Bayındırbank A.Ş.) 
 Adabank A.Ş 
 Türk Ticaret Bankası A.Ş

Foreign banks

Foreign deposit banks founded in Turkey
 Alternatif Bank A.Ş. 
 Arap Türk Bankası A.Ş. (A&T Bank) 
 Bank of China Turkey A.Ş. 
 Burgan Bank A.Ş. 
 Citibank A.Ş. 
 Denizbank A.Ş. 
 Deutsche Bank A.Ş. 
 HSBC Bank A.Ş. 
 ICBC Turkey Bank A.Ş.  (formerly Tekstilbank A.Ş.)
 ING A.Ş. 
 MUFG Bank Turkey A.Ş. 
 Odea Bank A.Ş. 
 QNB Finansbank A.Ş. (owned by Qatar National Bank) 
 Rabobank A.Ş. 
 Turkland Bank A.Ş. 
 Türkiye Garanti Bankası A.Ş.

Foreign deposit banks having branches in Turkey
 Bank Mellat 
 Habib Bank Limited 
 Intesa Sanpaolo S.p.A. 
 JPMorganChase N.A.  
 Société Générale (SA)

Participation banks (interest-free banking/Islamic banking)

State-owned participation banks 
 Türkiye Emlak Katılım Bankası A.Ş. 
 Ziraat Katılım Bankası A.Ş. 
 Vakıf Katılım Bankası A.Ş.

Privately owned participation banks
 Türkiye Finans Katılım Bankası A.Ş. (Turkey Finance Participation Bank Inc.)

Foreign participation banks founded in Turkey
 Albaraka Türk Katılım Bankası A.Ş. (Albaraka Türk Participation Bank Inc.) 
 Kuveyt Türk Katılım Bankası A.Ş. (Kuwait Turk Participation Bank Inc.)

Development and investment banks

State-owned development and investment banks
 İller Bankası 
 Türk Eximbank 
 Türkiye Kalkınma Bankası A.Ş.

Privately owned development and investment banks
 Aktif Yatırım Bankası A.Ş. 
 Diler Yatırım Bankası A.Ş. 
 Golden Global Yatırım Bankası A.Ş. 
 GSD Yatırım Bankası A.Ş. 
 IMKB Takas ve Saklama Bankası A.Ş. 
 Nurol Yatırım Bankası A.Ş. 
 Türkiye Sınai Kalkınma Bankası A.Ş.

Foreign development and investment banks
 BankPozitif Kredi ve Kalkınma Bankası A.Ş 
 Merrill Lynch Yatırım Bank A.Ş. 
 Pasha Yatırım Bankası A.Ş. 
 Standard Chartered Yatırım Bankası Türk A.Ş.

Defunct banks
 Anadolu Bank (1961)
 Bank Asya, Asya Katılım Bankası A.Ş. (Bank Asya is the trademark of Asia Participation Bank Inc.) 
 Bank Ekspres
 Bank Kapital
 Bayındır Bank
 Demirbank
 Dışbank A.Ş.
 Egebank
 EGS Bank
 Emlak Kredi Bank
 Esbank
 Etibank
 İktisat Bankası
 İmar Bankası
 Impexbank
 İnterbank
 İstanbul Bank
 Kentbank
 Koçbank
 Marmara Bank
 Osmanlı Bankası (Ottoman Bank)
 Oyak Bank
 Pamukbank
 Raybank
 Sitebank
 Sümerbank
 Taib Yatırım Bank A.Ş.
 Tarişbank
 Toprak Bank
 Töbank
 Türk Ticaret Bankası
 Tütünbank-Yaşarbank
 TYT Bank
 Ulusal Bank
 Yurtbank

Notes

References
 Turkey's Banks: And Banking System by Dr. Selcuk Abac. Text in English, Contains colour plates, charts, graphs and diagrams. (Detail from a copy of Turkey's Banks published by Euromoney Publications (London) in association with Various Banks in 1986 with an )
 Marois, Thomas (2012). States, Banks, and Crisis: Emerging Finance Capitalism in Mexico and Turkey, Cheltenham, Gloucestershire, UK: Edward Elgar Publishing.

External links
The Banks Association of Turkey
Address and Contact details of Turkish Banks
Turkish Participation Banks' Association
BDDK Finansal Piyasalar Raporu – Eylul 2006

Turkey
Banks
Turkey
Turkey